Chin Su Phin (Pha̍k-fa-sṳ: Chhìn Su-phìn) is a Malaysian politician from Liberal Democratic Party. He has been the President of LDP since 2018. He was also a Member of Dewan Negara from 2011 to 2014.

Election result

Honours 
  :
  Commander of the Order of Kinabalu (PGDK) - Datuk (2005)

References 

21st-century Malaysian politicians
Place of birth missing (living people)
Presidents of Liberal Democratic Party (Malaysia)
Members of the Dewan Negara
Malaysian people of Chinese descent
Malaysian politicians of Chinese descent
Living people
Year of birth missing (living people)
Commanders of the Order of Kinabalu